Isotenes eurymenes is a species of moth of the  family Tortricidae. It is found in Papua, Indonesia, on New Guinea.

References

Moths described in 1930
Archipini